Moresby is a surname. Notable people with the surname include:

 Archer Moresby (1867–?), New Zealand cricketer 
 Elizabeth Louisa Moresby (1862–1931), British novelist
 Fairfax Moresby (1786–1877), British admiral
 George Moresby-White ( 1933–1952), British playwright and screenwriter
 John Moresby (1830–1922), British admiral
 Robert Moresby (1794–1854 or 1863), British naval captain and hydrographer